A vertical file (sometimes referred to as a clippings file or pamphlet file) is a collection of material such as news clippings, booklets, maps, pictures, pamphlets, tourism brochures, and other grey literature, created and maintained by libraries and other organizations. The materials are typically loose, separate pieces organized in folders and arranged by subject. Vertical files are used as ready reference material to supplement other collections on topics not easily covered by conventional material such as books. The name comes from the fact that these collections are often stored in the vertical style of filing cabinets (as opposed to the lateral).

Vertical files have been created since at least the early 1900s, however, their use and maintenance have waned in recent years due to the availability of information on the web.

The vertical file is related to the picture file, which is a collection of similar nature except that the contents are primarily images.

References

Reference works